Zoo Tycoon is a business simulation game developed by Blue Fang Games and released by Microsoft. Although first released for Microsoft Windows and Macintosh in 2001, it was ported to the Nintendo DS in 2005. It was followed by two expansion packs, Dinosaur Digs and Marine Mania, which were released in 2002, as well as a sequel, Zoo Tycoon 2, released in 2004.

Gameplay 

The goal of Zoo Tycoon is to create a thriving zoo by building exhibits to accommodate animals and keeping the guests and animals happy. Exhibit-building is one of the primary goals of Zoo Tycoon. To keep the guests and animals happy, exhibits  should be suitable to the animal; for example, a lion is best suited to a savannah environment. Choices in terrain, foliage, rocks, shelters, fences, toys and the presence of zookeepers all contribute to the suitability of an exhibit and the happiness of the animal. Guest happiness is dependent on animal choice, animal happiness, buildings, and scenery. Buildings include bathrooms, restaurants and food stands, shops, reptile houses, aviaries, and entertainment buildings such as movie theaters. Scenery involves aesthetics that raise guest happiness slightly, such as topiary art, light posts, and benches. Keeping both animal and guest happiness high allows the player to gain monetary awards and maintain a steady income. To help manage the expanding zoo, players can employ maintenance workers, zookeepers and tour guides. If the animals escape from their enclosures, they can attack and possibly kill guests and employees.

There are three modes in Zoo Tycoon: Tutorial, Scenario, and Freeform. Tutorial teaches the player how to build exhibits and keep guests happy. Scenario mode has the player complete a series of objectives under restrictions. These objectives may include achieving a certain guest and animal happiness, achieving a certain exhibit suitability, displaying a certain number of animals, or breeding a certain animal. Freeform allows the player to choose the amount of money and the map with which they start. They are presented with an open lot and a limited selection of animals, buildings, and scenery available for purchase. As the game progresses, more animals and items become playable. Additional animals and items may be researched, where money is invested to make them playable.

Development 
Blue Fang Games originally considered making a simulation game where the player would manage an airport, before the idea was dismissed by CEO Hank Howie, citing that compared to places like theme parks, airports are not "fun". The team then pivoted to a zoo building game, and quickly began research on animal care and behavior, sending artists, animators and developers to zoos in and around the Boston area, as well as flying a team out to the San Francisco Zoo. The team learned how zoos work in order to figure out where they were allowed to take creative liberties, citing that during the development for the Marine Mania expansion, the team gave dolphins the ability to do tricks that were not completely realistic because they thought it was more fun. The development team also carefully tried to strike a balance between teaching players about conservation and entertainment, citing the educational efforts put forth in real zoos.

Expansion packs

Zoo Tycoon was created in the wake of the success of the 1999 Hasbro Interactive game RollerCoaster Tycoon, which sold well for many years. Zoo Tycoon did well enough for Microsoft and Blue Fang Games to release two expansion packs: Dinosaur Digs, which added prehistoric-themed items and animals including mythical creatures, and Marine Mania, which added aquatic-themed items and animals.

Eventually, Microsoft bundled the expansion packs with Zoo Tycoon to create Zoo Tycoon Complete Collection as Hasbro had done for RollerCoaster Tycoon. This had the functionality of both expansion packs and bonus content.

Dinosaur Digs
Released on May 19, 2002, Dinosaur Digs includes 20 new prehistoric animals to choose from including mammoths, saber-toothed cats, and varied dinosaurs as well as prehistoric-themed items and buildings. In addition, new types of electrical fences to accommodate the animals and prehistoric foliage have been introduced. As in the previous game, more extinct animals, foliage and better care for dinosaurs can be researched. Each dinosaur is adopted as an egg. The game introduces a new staff member, the scientist, to care for the egg and, once it hatches, the dinosaur itself.

Despite the fact that the player can purchase electrified fences to keep dinosaurs contained in exhibits, it is still possible for them to escape. If one does escape, the player will have to hire a dinosaur recovery team to find and tranquilize it so that it can be returned to its exhibit.

Marine Mania
The second expansion pack to the game wherein players can create and manage underwater exhibits or merge aquatic tanks with traditional land habitats was released on October 17, 2002. Interactive tutorials and virtual marine specialists are available to help players maintain animal happiness. In addition, 10 new scenarios were added. The expansion pack provides the ability to create aquatic shows.

Reception

Eric Bratcher reviewed the PC version of the game for Next Generation, rating it three stars out of five, and stated that "A pleasant diversion, but it's about as deep as a puddle, and frustratingly finicky."

Zoo Tycoon was received with mixed to positive reviews, gaining an average 68 out of 100 at Metacritic. GameZone gave the game a score of 8 out of 10.

Zoo Tycoon and its compiled Complete Collection garnered several awards and accolades, gaining the Bologna New Media Prize in 2002. Zoo Tycoon: Complete Collection received the Parents' Choice Foundation Gold Award - 2003, the AIAS Computer Family Title of the Year Interactive Achievement Award - 2004, the Scholastic Parent & Child Teacher's Pick – 2004, and the Children's Software Revue All Star Award – 2004.

Sales
Zoo Tycoon was a commercial success. Within a year of release, the game rose above 1 million copies in sales. By October 2003, its global sales had surpassed 2.5 million copies, or 3 million when grouped with its expansion packs. The NPD Group declared it the eighth-best-selling computer game of 2002, and the 11th-best-selling of 2003. NPD proceeded to rank the game's Zoo Tycoon: Complete Collection bundle 10th for 2004, 16th for 2005 and 12th for 2006.

In the United States alone, Zoo Tycoon sold 1.1 million units and earned $28.2 million by August 2006. It was among the country's 15 highest-selling computer games ever by July 2004, and Edge ranked it as the country's fifth-best-selling computer game released between January 2000 and August 2006.

The Zoo Tycoon series, including the original Zoo Tycoon, surpassed 4 million copies in global sales by July 2004. Over 2 million copies of the series were sold in the United States alone by that date. Series sales in the country rose to 2.9 million units by August 2006.

Sequel
Zoo Tycoon 2 was released in November 2004. Although initially containing fewer animals than the original Zoo Tycoon, more animals were introduced in its expansion packs: Zoo Tycoon 2: Endangered Species, Zoo Tycoon 2: African Adventure, Zoo Tycoon 2: Marine Mania, and Zoo Tycoon 2: Extinct Animals. The first two were bundled in the Zoo Tycoon 2: Zookeeper Collection; all of them were bundled in Zoo Tycoon 2 Ultimate Collection.

References

External links
 

2001 video games
Blue Fang Games games
Dinosaurs in video games
Interactive Achievement Award winners
Classic Mac OS games
MacOS games
Microsoft games
Single-player video games
Video games about animals
Video games developed in the United States
Video games set in zoos
Video games with expansion packs
Video games with isometric graphics
Windows games
Zoo Tycoon
D.I.C.E. Award for Family Game of the Year winners